Soltaniyeh (also Romanized as Solţānīyeh, Solţāneyyeh, Sultaniye, and Sultānīyeh; also known as Sa‘īdīyeh;) is a city in the Central District of Soltaniyeh County, Zanjan province, Iran, and serves as capital of the county. At the 2006 census, its population was 5,864 in 1,649 households, when it was in Soltaniyeh District of Abhar County. The following census in 2011 counted 7,116 people in 2,013 households. The latest census in 2016 showed a population of 7,638 people in 2,319 households, by which time Soltaniyeh County had been established with the city of Soltaniyeh as its capital.

History 
Its name which refers to the Islamic ruler title sultan translates loosely as "the Regal". Soltaniyeh was visited by Ruy González de Clavijo, who reported that the city was a hub of silk exportation.

In 2005, UNESCO listed Soltaniyeh as one of the World Heritage Sites. The road from Zanjan to Soltaniyeh extends until it reaches to the Katale khor cave.

William Dalrymple notes that Öljaitü intended Soltaniyeh to be "the largest and most magnificent city in the world" but that it "died with him" and is now "a deserted, crumbling spread of ruins."

Ecclesiastical history 
Established on 1 April 1318 as Latin Metropolitan Archdiocese of Soltania (Latin and Curiate Italian) or Soltaniyeh.

It 1329 the Latin Diocese of Samarcanda became its suffragan for the Chagatai Khanate, at least until Tamerlane (founder of the Timurids) swept its see Samarkand.

Suppressed as residential see around 1450.

Residential archbishops 
(all Roman Rite and European missionary members of the same Latin Order)

Metropolitan Archbishops of Soltania
 Francesco da Perugia, Dominican Order O.P. (1318.08.01 – ?)
Guillaume Adam, O.P. (1322.10.06 – 1324.10.26); previously Archbishop of Smirna (Smyrna) (Asian Turkey, now Izmir) (1318 – 1322.10.06); later Metropolitan Archbishop of Bar (Montenegro) (1324.10.26 – death 1341)
 Giovanni di Cori, O.P. (1329.08.09 – ?)
 Guglielmo, O.P. (? – ?)
 Giovanni di Piacenza, O.P. (1349.01.09 – ?)
 Tommaso, O.P. (1368.02.28 – ?)
 Domenico Manfredi, O.P. (1388.08.18 – ?)
 Giovanni di Gallofonte, O.P. (1398.08.26 – ?)
 Nicolò Roberti (1401.01.24 – ?); previously Bishop of Ferrara (Italy) (1393.02.04 – 1401.01.24)
 Thomas Abaraner, O.P. (1425.12.19 – ?)
 Giovanni, O.P. (1425.12.19 – ?)

Titular see 
Transformed at its suppression as residential see in 1450 into a Latin Titular archbishopric, which was itself suppressed in 1926.

It has had the following incumbents, of both the fitting archiepiscopal (intermediary) and the (lower) episcopal ranks :
 Titular Bishop Francisco Salazar, Friars Minor (O.F.M.) (1548.09.12 – ?)
 Titular Bishop: Bishop-elect Bernardino de Carmona (1551.07.10 – ?)
 Titular Archbishop Alberto Bitter (1922.10.09 – 1926.12.19)

See also 
 Dome of Soltaniyeh
 Ab Anbar
 List of Catholic dioceses in Central Asia
 Yakhchal
 Traditional water sources of Persian antiquity

Sources and external links 
 Official website
 GCatholic, with residential and titular incumbent bio links
 Video of Soltaniyeh
 Farnoush Tehrāni, The Crown of All Domes, in Persian, Jadid Online, 31 December 2009,.• Audio slideshow: (6 min 45 sec).
http://sultaniyya.org/

Further reading

References 

Soltaniyeh County

Cities in Zanjan Province

Populated places in Zanjan Province

Populated places in Soltaniyeh County

World Heritage Sites in Iran